Barkhatnaya Sopka is a volcano located in the southern part of Kamchatka Peninsula, Russia, along the Paratunka River.

See also
 List of volcanoes in Russia

References 
 

Volcanoes of the Kamchatka Peninsula
Mountains of the Kamchatka Peninsula
Holocene lava domes
Holocene Asia